Lewis Alexander Grant-Ogilvy (or Grant-Ogilvie), 5th Earl of Seafield FRSE (22 March 1767 – 26 October 1840), briefly known as Sir Lewis Alexander Grant, Bt, in 1811, was a Scottish peer and Member of Parliament. He was Chief of Clan Grant. His promising career was cut short by mental instability.

Life
He was born at Moy near Inverness, the son of Jean Duff (1746-1805) and Sir James Grant, 8th Baronet. He was christened at Dyke a few days later. He was educated at Edinburgh High School and Westminster School, then studied law at the University of Edinburgh and Lincoln's Inn in London.

In 1788 he was elected a Fellow of the Royal Society of Edinburgh. His proposers were Dugald Stewart, James Gregory, and Andrew Dalzell.

He was elected to the House of Commons for Elginshire in 1790, a seat he held until 1796. From 1791 his health began to fail and by 1805 he was described as being a "most hopeless case of mental derangement". In 1794 he was diagnosed as incurable but did not surrender his seat as an MP until 1796.

In February 1811 he succeeded his father as ninth Baronet of Colquhoun. Eight months later, in October 1811, he became the fifth Earl of Seafield on the death of his second cousin James Ogilvy, 7th Earl of Findlater and 4th Earl of Seafield. Seafield was the grandson of Lady Margaret Ogilvy, daughter of the prominent statesman James Ogilvy, 4th Earl of Findlater and 1st Earl of Seafield. However, he was not in remainder to the earldom of Findlater which title became extinct. He assumed the additional surname of Ogilvy on succeeding in the earldom.

Lord Seafield never married. He died at Cullen House in Banffshire on 26 October 1840, aged 73, and was buried in the Mausoleum in Duthil Old Parish Church and Churchyard. He was succeeded by his younger brother Francis William Ogilvy-Grant who had already taken over all practical duties and curatorship of the estates from the point of his mental instability.

His uncles included Henry Mackenzie and Alexander Penrose Cumming-Gordon.

References

1767 births
1840 deaths
Earls of Seafield
Alumni of the University of Edinburgh
Grant, Lewis Grant-Ogilvy, 4th Lord
Scottish clan chiefs